Arangu-ye Pain (also Romanized as Ārangū-ye Pā’īn and Ārangū Pā’īn) is a village in Senderk Rural District, Senderk District, Minab County, Hormozgan Province, Iran. At the 2006 census, its population was 343, in 74 families.

References 

Populated places in Minab County